Milan Bartovič (born April 9, 1981) is a Slovak former professional ice hockey left winger, who last played for HK Dukla Trenčín in the Slovak Extraliga. He was drafted 35th overall by the Buffalo Sabres in the 1999 NHL Entry Draft.

Playing career
After playing junior hockey in the Western Hockey League for the Tri-City Americans and Brandon Wheat Kings, Bartovič began his professional career in 2001–02 with the Rochester Americans of the American Hockey League. Through 2004–05, Bartovič played in the National Hockey League for the Buffalo Sabres for a total of 26 games. On October 24, 2005, the Sabres traded Bartovič to the Chicago Blackhawks for goaltender Michael Leighton.

After playing 24 games for the Blackhawks and an additional 49 games with the Norfolk Admirals of the AHL, Bartovič became a free agent on July 1, 2006, and elected to play in Sweden for the 2006–07 season.  In the summer of 2007, he signed a one-year deal with the Atlanta Thrashers before leaving to return to Europe the following season with Malmö IF of the Elitserien in Sweden.

On May 31, 2010, Bartovič signed a one-year contract as a free agent with Atlant Moscow Oblast of the Russian KHL.

Milan was a member of the Slovakia team that competed at the 2006 World Championships, and also was a member of the Slovakia men's national team inline hockey team that competed at the 2007 Men's World Inline Hockey Championships.

Career statistics

Regular season and playoffs

International

References

External links
 
 
 

1981 births
Atlant Moscow Oblast players
Brandon Wheat Kings players
Buffalo Sabres draft picks
Buffalo Sabres players
Chicago Blackhawks players
HC Bílí Tygři Liberec players
HK Dukla Trenčín players
Living people
Malmö Redhawks players
Norfolk Admirals players
Olympic ice hockey players of Slovakia
Ice hockey players at the 2014 Winter Olympics
Sportspeople from Trenčín
Rochester Americans players
Slovak ice hockey right wingers
HC Slovan Bratislava players
Tri-City Americans players
HC Vítkovice players
ZSC Lions players
Slovak expatriate ice hockey players in the United States
Slovak expatriate ice hockey players in Sweden
Slovak expatriate ice hockey players in Switzerland
Slovak expatriate ice hockey players in Canada
Slovak expatriate ice hockey players in Russia
Slovak expatriate ice hockey players in the Czech Republic